Inside Running is an Australian television series which screened in 1989 on the ABC. The thirteen part series focused on the professional and personal lives of six barristers.

Inside Running was created by Bill Garner and John Reeves and produced by Ross Dimsey. It was written by Judith Colquhoun, Graeme Farmer, Bill Garner, Alison Nisselle, John Reeves, John Romeril, Jan Sardi, Colin Golvan, Rick Held, Peter Hepworth, John Lord and Alan Maddon It was directed by Peter Baroutis, Gary Conway, Peter R Dodds, Helen Gaynor, Robert Meillon and Karl Steinberg.

Cast
 Lewis Fiander as Robbie Renard QC
 Genevieve Picot as Penelope Phillips
 Kirsty Child as Beverly Lamb
 Peter Curtin as Dermott O'Brien
 Scott Burgess as Christopher Parvo
 Donald Battee as Antoine
 Taya Straton as Susan-Elizabeth Wallberg
 Robert Coleby
 Gia Carides 
 Rod Mullinar
 Anne Phelan

See also 
 List of Australian television series

References

External links
 
 Inside Running at the Australian Television Information Archive

Australian adventure television series
1989 Australian television series debuts
Australian Broadcasting Corporation original programming